This is a list of life peerages in the Peerage of the United Kingdom created under the Life Peerages Act 1958 from the time the Act came into effect to 1979, grouped by prime minister. During this period there were five prime ministers: three Conservatives, Harold Macmillan, Alec Douglas-Home, and Edward Heath, and two from the Labour Party, Harold Wilson (who served twice) and James Callaghan.



Harold Macmillan (1958–1963)

‡ former MP

Alec Douglas-Home (1963–1964)

‡ former MP

Harold Wilson (1964–1970)

‡ former MP

Edward Heath (1970–1974)

‡ former MP

Harold Wilson (1974–1976)

‡ former MP

James Callaghan (1976–1979)

‡ former MP

See also
 List of life peerages (complete list of life peerages granted since 1958)
 List of hereditary peers in the House of Lords by virtue of a life peerage

References

Notes

1958
1950s in the United Kingdom
1960s in the United Kingdom
1970s in the United Kingdom